Heteroderidae  is a family of nematodes. The name comes from the Greek heteros = other and deras = skin (derm). This "refers to the different 'skins' of female and cyst."

Genetics 
GenBank has unusually extensive coverage of Heteroderidae internal transcribed spacers, most of which has been generated by Sergei Subbotin and collaborators (Subbotin et al. 1999, Clapp et al. 2000, Subbotin et al. 2000, Zeng et al. 2000, Subbotin et al. 2001, Amiri & Subbotin 2002, Subbotin et al. 2003). Overall Subbotin et al. find the preexisting taxonomy to fit very well with these sequences, with some room for further diversification of recognized species to fit this new molecular evidence.

References 

Tylenchida
Plant pathogenic nematodes
Nematode families